Furazolidone is a nitrofuran antibacterial agent and monoamine oxidase inhibitor (MAOI). It is marketed by Roberts Laboratories under the brand name Furoxone and by GlaxoSmithKline as Dependal-M.

Medical uses
Furazolidone has been used in human and veterinary medicine. It has a broad spectrum of activity being active against
 Gram positive
 Clostridium perfringens
 Corynebacterium pyogenes
 Streptococci
 Staphylococci
 Gram negative
 Escherichia coli
 Salmonella dublin
 Salmonella typhimurium
 Shigella
 Protozoa
 Giardia lamblia
 Eimeria species
 Histomonas meleagridis

Use in humans
In humans it has been used to treat diarrhoea and enteritis caused by bacteria or protozoan infections, including traveler's diarrhoea, cholera and bacteremic salmonellosis.
Use in treating Helicobacter pylori infections has also been proposed.

Furazolidone has also been used for giardiasis (due to Giardia lamblia), amoebiasis and shigellosis also though it is not a first line treatment.

Use in animals
As a veterinary medicine, furazolidone has been used with some success to treat salmonids for Myxobolus cerebralis infections.

It has also been used in aquaculture.

Since furazolidone is a nitrofuran antibiotic, its use in food animals is currently prohibited by the FDA under the Animal Medicinal Drug Use Clarification Act, 1994.

Furazolidone is no longer available in the US.

Use in laboratory
It is used to differentiate micrococci and staphylococci.

Mechanism of action
It is believed to work by crosslinking of DNA.

Side effects
Though an effective antibiotic when all others fail, against extremely drug resistant infections, it has many side effects. including inhibition of monoamine oxidase, and as with other nitrofurans generally, minimum inhibitory concentrations also produce systemic toxicity: tremors, convulsions, peripheral neuritis, gastrointestinal disturbances, depression of spermatogenesis. Nitrofurans are recognized by FDA as mutagens/carcinogens, and can no longer be used since 1991.

See also
 Nitrofurazone
 Nitrofurantoin
 Norwich Pharmacal Co. & Others v Customs and Excise Commissioners

References

Acetaldehyde dehydrogenase inhibitors
Antibiotics
Antiprotozoal agents
Nitrofurans
Monoamine oxidase inhibitors
2-Oxazolidinones
Hydrazones